Susan Diana Barham Noel-Powell (8 June 1912 – October 1991) was an English squash and tennis player. Noel was taught to play squash and tennis by her father Evan Noel, a successful racquets player.

Squash career 
Noel won the British Open three times in a row from 1932 to 1934. She won the final in straight sets on all three occasions. She was also the runner-up at the championship in 1939 when she lost to Margot Lumb.

Noel won the U.S. National Championships in 1933 and won the Atlantic Coast Women's Squash Championships title in 1933, defeating Cecily Fenwick in the final.

Tennis career 
Partnering Jadwiga Jędrzejowska, Noel finished runner-up in the women's doubles at the French Championships in 1936. Noel and Jędrzejowska lost in the final to Simonne Mathieu and Billie Yorke 2–6, 6–4, 6–4.

Grand Slam tournaments finals

Doubles (1 runner-up)

References

External links
Official British Open Squash Championships website
British Open historical data at Squashtalk.com

English female squash players
1912 births
1991 deaths
English female tennis players
British female tennis players
Place of birth missing